The list is mainly based on CIA World Factbook for the year 2016 and 2019.
The Chinese, Brazilian, Indian, and United States government budgets are the figures reported by the International Monetary Fund.

The table includes information from government's budgets; namely revenues, expenditures and the resulting deficits or surpluses. The countries are ranked by their budget revenues in fiscal year 2016. Both sovereign states and dependent territories are included.

List

These figures are given as millions USD, unless otherwise specified.

See also
 List of countries by government budget per capita
 List of countries by tax revenue to GDP ratio
 List of countries by government spending as percentage of GDP

Europe:
 List of sovereign states in Europe by budget revenues
 List of sovereign states in Europe by budget revenues per capita

United States:
 List of U.S. state budgets

References